André Izepon Astorga (born 7 January 1980) is a Brazilian former footballer who played as a central defender.

Club career
Astorga previously played two seasons for Rot-Weiß Oberhausen in the German 2. Bundesliga.

References

External links

1980 births
Living people
Brazilian footballers
Associação Portuguesa Londrinense players
Vila Nova Futebol Clube players
Santos FC players
Clube Atlético Bragantino players
Sport Club do Recife players
Associação Portuguesa de Desportos players
Clube Atlético Juventus players
Hannover 96 players
Rot-Weiß Oberhausen players
Liga I players
CFR Cluj players
Süper Lig players
Eskişehirspor footballers
Brazilian expatriate footballers
Expatriate footballers in Romania
Expatriate footballers in Germany
Expatriate footballers in Turkey
Association football defenders